San Luis del Palmar is a town in Corrientes Province, Argentina. It is the head town of the San Luis del Palmar Department.

From 1912 until 1927 San Luis del Palmar had a railway station on the Ferrocarril Económico Correntino narrow gauge railway between Corrientes and Mburucuyá

External links

 [ Municipal website]

Populated places in Corrientes Province